Iñigo Monreal Saénz (born 26 September 1974 in Pamplona, Navarre) is a retired track and field athlete from Spain, who represented his native country at two consecutive Summer Olympics, starting in 1996. He competed in the 400m hurdles and in the 4x400m relay.

In the 2008 Spanish General Election, he was a candidate for the Congress of Deputies with Nafarroa Bai.

Notes

References

External links
 
 
 
 

1974 births
Living people
Spanish male hurdlers
Spanish male sprinters
Athletes (track and field) at the 1996 Summer Olympics
Athletes (track and field) at the 2000 Summer Olympics
Olympic athletes of Spain
Sportspeople from Pamplona
Politicians from Navarre